Griffith's sign is a clinical sign in which there is lid lag of the lower eyelid on moving the eye upwards. It is found in Graves' ophthalmopathy.

See also 
 Von Graefe's sign
 Boston's sign

References 

Symptoms and signs: Endocrinology, nutrition, and metabolism
Endocrinology
Medical signs